Gladstone Eyre (11 June 1862 – 2 May 1933) was an Australian portrait artist and landscape painter around Sydney, New South Wales and Launceston, Tasmania in the late 19th and early 20th centuries.

Early life 

William James Gladstone Eyre was born on 11 June 1862 in Brunswick, Victoria, the child of William Eyre and Amelia née Watts.  The other siblings were Arthur Willesley Eyre (b. 1856), Alice Augusta H. C. Eyre (b. 1858), Samuel Morton Pets Eyre (b. 1860), Charles Pelham Villiers Eyre (b. 1864), Henry John Temple Eyre (b. 1864), Mary Amelia Victoria Felicia Eyre (b. 1865), Josephine Fanny Eyre (b. 1867), Frances Burdett Coutts Eyre (b./d. 1868), and Frederick Constantine Grosvenor Eyre (b. 1869, d. 1870).

His eldest brother Arthur went to Scotch College, Melbourne in 1868, where Dutch–Australian painter Henry Leonardus van den Houten (1801–1879) taught.   Eyre was taught elementary drawing by van den Houten.

In 1877 the family moved to Sydney, and Eyre studied under Norwegian painter Knud Bull (1811–1889).   Eyre's father was a land developer and later established the Blue Mountains township of Leura, the area of interest becoming of interest to Eyre.

Aged twenty, Eyre married Margaret Ross Falconer, of Balmain, on 26 June 1883 at Saint James' Church, Sydney.

They had three children. A daughter, Winifred Margaret was born 10 April 1884, when they lived at Eleanor Villa, Snail's Bay, Balmain. Their infant son Julian William Eyre died aged 1 year and 5 months on 22 November 1889, when they lived at Bellagie, Hunter's Hill. Their third child was a son, Everett (given as John Everett Millais Eyre), born in Launceston in March 1892.

Career 

In 1883 Eyre became a member of the Art Society of New South Wales (and again in 1904 when returning to the State), and through the 1880s, he established himself as a portrait painter.  He operated a studio at the Pastoral Chambers, at 375 George Street.  Others' paintings were advertised and sold commercially including in 1884, J. M. W. Turner's renown 1831 'Caligula's palace'.

Eyre moved to Launceston in 1891 with his wife and family where his paintings were displayed in a shop front of a local photographer.  His Tasmanian landscapes were in oils, crayon, and watercolours.  Eyre went onto teach evening classes, and undertaking the restoration of old paintings.  He donated at least one painting for charitable purposes, including in 1900 of a portrait of Lord Roberts for the Indian famine relief fund, as well as regularly selling his works.  In April 1899, he travelled to Sydney to sell a collection of his paintings, mostly Tasmanian scenery.

In 1902, aged 39, Eyre and his family moved back to Sydney in 1902.  It was indicated the then-Australia Hotel in Sydney contained a number of very fine paintings of Australian scenes including eight watercolours by Eyre.

Later life 

His daughter Winifred became involved in stage productions in Launceston in the late 1890s.  Eyre also recited and sung at these productions, and painted the background sceneries.  Winifred later married Oswald Augustus Nelson in North Sydney on 4 August 1906.

His son Everett married Mary Daly, had a daughter Joyce, but died aged 36, on 7 January 1929 in Sydney, when the family was living at 1 Chandos Street, Saint Leonards.  He was buried at the Church of England Cemetery, Northern Suburbs, Sydney.

Eyre resided at 56 Middle Street, McMahon's Point, North Sydney until his death in 1933.  Suffering from insomnia for some time, he left his home early on Monday morning, but was found floating at Athol Bight near the zooloogical gardens on Tuesday, 2 May 1933.  He was privately interred at the Northern Suburbs Cemetery.

Works 

A sample of some of Eyre's portraits, and landscapes.

Portraits 

 W. Saurin Lyster (1828–1880), impresario (1881).  Commissioned by vocalist Armes Beaumont.
 John Tait (1813–1888), racehorse owner (1883), life-size.
 Archbishop Vaughan (1834–1883), Sydney (1883).
 Vincent Giblin (1817–1884), late-general manager of the Australian Joint Stock Bank (1884).
 Sir Alfred Stephen, Lieutenant-governor of the Colony of New South Wales (1885), in oils.
 J. T. Gannon, President of the Mechanics' Institute, Goulburn, New South Wales (1885), life-size bust, in oils, drawn from an earlier photograph.
 Truganini (1891).
 Sir Henry Parkes (pre-1898).  This may have been separate to the 1881 large life-size portrait in oils, painted with the NSW premier wearing decorations including the KCMG.  Another portrait from life, in oils, of Parkes was painted in September 1885.
 Sir William Lambert Dobson (1833–1898), late-Chief Justice, Tasmania (1898).
 Major-General Robert Baden-Powell (1900), attired in the uniform of the 5th Dragoon Guards, in oils.

Landscapes 

 'Cataract Gorge, First basin', Launceston (1892), once exhibited in the Victoria Museum and Art Gallery.  It has been exhibited as recently as 2020.  The original sketch was done in December 1891 when the Cataract was in flood.

See also 

 List of Australian artists

Notes

References 

1862 births
1933 deaths
20th-century Australian artists
People from Victoria (Australia)
People educated at Scotch College, Melbourne
Australian landscape painters
Australian portrait painters
19th-century Australian painters
19th-century Australian male artists
20th-century Australian painters
20th-century Australian male artists
Australian male painters